Marko Radivojević (born 24 September 1995) is a Serbian football forward who currently plays for FK Trajal on loan from Dinamo Vranje.

References

External links
 
 Marko Radivojević stats at utakmica.rs

1995 births
Living people
People from Trstenik, Serbia
Association football forwards
Serbian footballers
OFK Beograd players
FK Voždovac players
FK Dinamo Vranje players
Serbian First League players
Serbian SuperLiga players